Danièle Hoffman-Rispal (22 June 1951 – 16 April 2020) was a member of the National Assembly of France.  She represented the city of Paris,  and was a member of the parliamentary group Socialist, Republican, and Citizen Group (SRC). She died on 16 April 2020, aged 68.

References

1951 births
2020 deaths
Politicians from Paris
Socialist Party (France) politicians
Women members of the National Assembly (France)
Deputies of the 12th National Assembly of the French Fifth Republic
Deputies of the 13th National Assembly of the French Fifth Republic
21st-century French women politicians
Councillors of Paris
Deaths from cancer in France